Thomas Daniel Kirk (September 27, 1927 – August 1, 1974) was a professional baseball player.  He was an outfielder for one season (1947) with the Philadelphia Athletics.  For his career, he was hitless in one at-bat in one game.

He was born and later died in Philadelphia at the age of 46.

External links

1927 births
1974 deaths
Philadelphia Athletics players
Major League Baseball outfielders
Baseball players from Pennsylvania
Lancaster Red Roses players
Martinsville A's players
Lincoln A's players
Ottawa A's players
Austin Pioneers players
Pueblo Dodgers players
Elmira Pioneers players
Birmingham Barons players
Beaumont Exporters players